Jiří Siegel (5 March 1927 – 16 June 2012) was a Czech architect and basketball player. 

He studied at the Architecture University in Prague. He was playing basketball during his university studies, he even competed in the men's tournament at the 1948 Summer Olympics.

As an architect, he was employed by Sportprojekt Praha. He also designed several sports buildings, like Sports hall Folimanka in Prague.

References

1927 births
2012 deaths
Czech men's basketball players
Olympic basketball players of Czechoslovakia
Basketball players at the 1948 Summer Olympics
Sportspeople from Prague
Czech architects